Anjali Devi (born 15 September 1998) is an Indian athlete. She competed in the women's 400 metres event at the 2019 World Athletics Championships. She did not advance to compete in the semi-finals.

References

External links
 

1998 births
Living people
Indian female sprinters
Place of birth missing (living people)
World Athletics Championships athletes for India